Ham-sur-Heure Castle is a castle in Ham-sur-Heure, a village in the municipality of Ham-sur-Heure-Nalinnes, province of Hainaut, Wallonia, Belgium.

From 1491 to 1941 it belonged to the de Mérode family, and from 1941 to 1952 to the descendants of Charles John d'Oultremont. They sold it to the municipal authorities of Ham-sur-Heure, who used it as their town hall. After the local government reorganisation of 1977 it became the town hall of the present municipality of Ham-sur-Heure-Nalinnes.

See also
List of castles in Belgium
 Jean Charles Joseph, Count of Merode, Marquis of Deynze, born and dead in Ham-sur-Heure Castle (1719-1774)

External links

Château d'Ham-sur-Heur, Tourist office Visit Hainaut

Castles in Belgium
Castles in Hainaut (province)